Stefano Benni (born 12 August 1947) is an Italian satirical writer, poet and journalist. His books have been translated into around 20 foreign languages and scored notable commercial success. 2.5 million copies of his books have been sold in Italy.

Biography
Benni has written many successful novels and anthologies, among which are Bar Sport, Elianto, Terra!, La compagnia dei celestini, Baol, Comici spaventati guerrieri, Saltatempo, Margherita Dolcevita and Il bar sotto il mare.
He has also worked with the weekly magazines L'espresso and Panorama, and with the satirical  Cuore and Tango, the monthly magazines Linus and Il Mago (where he began and published in installments part of Bar Sport), and the newspapers La Repubblica and il manifesto.

He also wrote television sketches for Beppe Grillo at the beginning of Grillo's career, and one of these sketches – called "Pietro Longo=P2" – caused the Psdi to ask the RAI commission to remove Grillo from RAI TV; their request was denied.

In 1989, with Umberto Angelucci, Benni directed the film Musica per vecchi animali, adapted from his book Comici spaventati guerrieri, with the actors Dario Fo, Paolo Rossi, and Viola Simoncioni. Two years before that he was also the screenwriter of another film, Topo Galileo by Francesco Laudadio, starring his friend Beppe Grillo and with music by Fabrizio De André and Mauro Pagani.

With the jazz musician Umberto Petrin, he wrote Misterioso. Viaggio nel silenzio di Thelonius Monk.

His novels contain, within imaginary worlds and situations, a strong satire of Italian society over the last few decades.  His writing style includes many puns, neologisms and parodies of other literary styles.

In January and February 2010, he presented the event Bennac, a meeting between himself and the French writer Daniel Pennac.

Bibliography
 Bar Sport (1976)
 Prima o poi l'amore arriva (1981)
 Terra! (1983), translated into English by Annapaola Cancogni (1985) (Pantheon Books)
 Stranalandia (1984)
 Comici spaventati guerrieri (1986)
 Il bar sotto il mare (1987)
 Baol (1990)
 Ballate (1991)
 La compagnia dei Celestini (1992)
 L'ultima lacrima (1994)
 Elianto (1996)
 Bar Sport Duemila (1997)
 Blues in sedici (1998)
 Teatro (1999)
 Spiriti (2000)
 Dottor Niù, corsivi diabolici per tragedie evitabili (2001)
 Saltatempo (2001), translated into English by Antony Shugaar as Timeskipper (2008)
 Achille pie' veloce (2003)
 Margherita Dolcevita (2005)
 Misterioso : viaggio nel silenzio di Thelonious Monk (2005) (includes DVD)
 La grammatica di Dio (2007)
 Pane e Tempesta  (2009)
 Le Beatrici  (2011)
 La Traccia dell'Angelo (2011)
 Di tutte le ricchezze (2012)
 La bottiglia magica (2016)
 Prendiluna (2017)
 Giura (2020)

Works in English 

 Timeskipper, translator Antony Shugaar, Europa Editions, New York, 2008. 
 Margherita Dolce Vita, translator Antony Shugaar, Europa Editions, New York, 2008. 
 The story of Cyrano de Bergerac, Pushkin Children's Books, London, 2014.

References

External links
 Official website (Italian)
 "The Story of First-Aid and Beauty Case"

1947 births
Living people
Writers from Bologna
Italian journalists
Italian male journalists
Italian male writers
Italian humorists
Italian satirists